Sir Yazjan or Sariz Jan or Serizjan may refer to:
Serizjan-e Namdi
Sir Yazjan-e Galeh Zan Abu ol Hasan Beygi
Sir Yazjan-e Galeh Zan Mazarai
Sirizjan